Bibliotheca Herpetologica: A Journal of the History and Bibliography of Herpetology is a biannual peer-reviewed scientific journal covering the history of herpetology and its bibliography. It is published by the [International Society for the History and Bibliography of Herpetology]. The journal was established in May 1999 as the International Society for the History and Bibliography of Herpetology Newsletter and Bulletin and obtained its current title in 2005 (volume 5, issue 2). The editor-in-chief is Christofer J. Bell (University of Texas at Austin). The journal is abstracted and indexed in The Zoological Record.

External links 
 International Society for the History and Bibliography of Herpetology

Herpetology journals
English-language journals
Publications established in 1999
Biannual journals
Academic journals published by learned and professional societies